Carlo Severini (10 March 1872 – 11 May 1951) was an Italian mathematician: he was born in Arcevia (Province of Ancona) and died in Pesaro. Severini, independently from Dmitri Fyodorovich Egorov, proved and published earlier a proof of the theorem now known as Egorov's theorem.

Biography
He graduated in Mathematics from the University of Bologna on November 30, 1897: the title of his "Laurea" thesis was "Sulla rappresentazione analitica delle funzioni arbitrarie di variabili reali". After obtaining his degree, he worked in Bologna as an assistant to the chair of Salvatore Pincherle until 1900. From 1900 to 1906, he was a senior high school teacher, first teaching in the Institute of Technology of La Spezia and then in the lyceums of Foggia and of Turin; then, in 1906 he became full professor of Infinitesimal Calculus at the University of Catania. He worked in Catania until 1918, then he went to the University of Genova, where he stayed until his retirement in 1942.

Work
His main contributions belong to the following fields of mathematics:

Approximation theory
In this field, Severini proved a generalized version of the Weierstrass approximation theorem. Precisely, he extended the original result of Karl Weierstrass to the class of bounded locally integrable functions, which is a class including particular discontinuous functions as members.

Measure theory and integration
Severini proved Egorov's theorem one year earlier than Dmitri Egorov in the paper , whose main theme is however sequences of orthogonal functions and their properties.

Partial differential equations
Severini proved an existence theorem for the Cauchy problem for the non linear hyperbolic partial differential equation of first order

Real analysis and unfinished works
Severini also left an unpublished and unfinished treatise on the theory of real functions, whose title was planned to be "Fondamenti dell'analisi nel campo reale e i suoi sviluppi".

Selected publications
. In the paper "On the analytic representation of discontinuous real functions of a real variable" (English translation of title) Severini extends the Weierstrass approximation theorem to a class of functions which can have particular kind of discontinuities.
. "On sequences of orthogonal functions" (English translation of title) contains Severini's most known result, i.e. the Severini–Egorov theorem.

See also
Hyperbolic partial differential equation
Orthogonal functions
Severini-Egorov theorem
Weierstrass approximation theorem

Notes

References

Biographical and general references
. A very short summary of the student file of Carlo Severini, giving however useful information about his laurea.
, available from the Biblioteca Digitale Italiana di Matematica. The obituary of Carlo Severini.
. In this short note Leonida Tonelli credits Severini for the first proof of Severini–Egorov theorem.
. "Italian mathematicians of the first century of the unitary state" is an important historical memoir giving brief biographies of the Italian mathematicians who worked and lived between 1861 and 1961.
.

Scientific references
. A monograph surveying the theory of hyperbolic equations up to its state of the art in the early 1960s, published by the Consiglio Nazionale delle Ricerche.
, available at Gallica.

External links
. Available from the Edizione Nazionale Mathematica Italiana.

1872 births
1951 deaths
People from Arcevia
19th-century Italian mathematicians
20th-century Italian mathematicians
Mathematical analysts